The Law of Darkness is a 1990 role-playing game adventure published by Mayfair Games for DC Heroes.

Publication history
The Law of Darkness was written by Scott Paul Maykrantz, with a cover by Paris Cullins and Mike DeCarlo, and was published by Mayfair Games in 1990 as a 48-page book.

Reviews
Dragon #165
White Wolf #26 (April/May, 1991)

References

DC Heroes adventures
Role-playing game supplements introduced in 1990